Tolberto III da Camino (1263–1317) was an Italian nobleman and military leader, a member of the Da Camino family.

Biography
The son of Guecellone VI da Camino, he was allied with his cousin Gherardo III da Camino when the latter became lord of Treviso in 1283. In exchange, he received the castles of Oderzo, Camino and Motta di Livenza, which he maintained after some controversies rose a few years later. In 1286 he was podestà of Belluno, while five years later he led an unsuccessful plot against Gherardo together with his brother Biaquino VI and the bishop of Belluno. The two brothers asked protection to the doge of Venice Pietro Gradenigo: in exchange, they ceded Motta di Livenza to the Venetians, starting the Republic's expansion in the Veneto mainland.

The two later occupied some territories near Prodolone in the Patriarchate of Aquileia, for which they were excommunicated by the patriarch. In his late life Tolberto reconciled  with  Gherardo, whose daughter Gaia he married to. In 1299 he became podestà of Treviso. After Gherardo's death and the succession of Rizzardo IV da Camino, he supported the latter's brother Guecellone VII (1312): however, a few months later he supported the plot which forced Guecellone to leave Treviso, effectively  ending the Da Camino's lordship in Treviso.

In 1317 he fought alongside the Trevigiani troops against Cangrande della Scala and the Count of Gorizia, but died suddenly in the same year.

Sources

1263 births
1317 deaths
Tolberto 03
13th-century Italian nobility
14th-century Italian nobility
People excommunicated by the Catholic Church
14th-century condottieri